In military terms, 107th Division or 107th Infantry Division may refer to:

 107th Infantry Division (German Empire) 
 107th Division (Imperial Japanese Army)
 107th Rifle Division (Soviet Union, World War II)
 107th Tank Division (Soviet Union, World War II)
 107th Infantry Division (United States)— planned but never established, see Divisions of the United States Army